Geoffrey Waddington (September 23, 1904, Leicester, England - January 3, 1966, Toronto) was a Canadian conductor and violinist.

Waddington was raised in Lethbridge, Alberta, where he began playing violin as a child; he was conducting by the time he was twelve years old. In 1922, he began working in radio and also took a position at the Toronto Conservatory of Music. In 1947 he began conducting for the CBC, and in 1952 founded the CBC Symphony Orchestra, which he led and directed through 1964. His position at CBC made him influential in identifying and popularizing Canadian classical musicians of distinction, and he commissioned several works from Canadian composers.

References

Canadian conductors (music)
Male conductors (music)
Canadian classical violinists
1904 births
1966 deaths
20th-century Canadian male musicians
20th-century Canadian violinists and fiddlers
Canadian male violinists and fiddlers
British emigrants to Canada